Janji Joni (English: Joni's Promise) is a 2005 Indonesian adventure romantic comedy film written and directed by Joko Anwar in his directorial debut. Starring Nicholas Saputra, Mariana Renata, Rachel Maryam, and Surya Saputra, the film was a commercial and critical success, earning Anwar his first Citra Award for Best Director nomination.

The film features multiple cameo appearances from well-known celebrities.

Synopsis
Joni works as a film/reel delivery man in Jakarta. One day, while waiting for the next pick-up, Joni meets a charming girl who is going to catch a film with her boyfriend Otto. The girl would only reveal her name to Joni if he successfully delivers the reels on time. However, things do not turn out well on that day as Joni faces obstacles such as the city's notorious traffic and various people that may disrupt his task.

Cast

Notable cameos

Production 
According to producer Nia Dinata, the shooting process for Janji Joni was very challenging due to unpredictable weather and also having to shoot secretly in certain areas due to the production team not having permits from local authorities. This was coupled with intimidation from local thugs who demanded payment in order for the crew to be able to shoot in certain locations. Overall, the shooting took place over 20 days.

Release 
Janji Joni received theatrical release on April 28, 2005 in Indonesia followed by Malaysia on September 1, 2005 and Singapore on November 9, 2006. It was screened at several international film festivals, including Busan International Film Festival, Deauville Asian Film Festival, and Bangkok International Film Festival.

A book containing Anwar's screenplay and production was published by Metafor titled Janji Joni: Skenario dan Catatan.

Reception 
Writing for Tempo, Leila Chudori praised the film, calling it "intelligent and calculated" while noting Anwar's "smart and sharp" directing style and singling out the performances of Nicholas Saputra and Surya Saputra.

In 2019, fourteen years since the film's release, Panos Katzothanasis reviewed the film for Asian Movie Pulse and called the film "unique" with "extremely intelligent, pointy, and ironic sense of humor" while noting that it "thrives in context, intelligent irony, and overall entertainment and is definitely among the best in Joko Anwar’s oeuvre." Katzothanasis singled out Nicholas Saputra and Sujiwo Tejo as stand-out performances in the film.

Tempo magazine named Janji Joni its pick for best film of the year.

Awards and nominations

References

External links
Official site

2005 films
2000s Indonesian-language films
2005 romantic comedy films
Films shot in Indonesia
Films set in Indonesia
Indonesian romantic comedy films
2005 directorial debut films
Films directed by Joko Anwar